Kong Sam Ol (born 1 November 1936) is a Cambodian politician who has been the minister of the Royal Palace since 1998. He was Minister of Agriculture, Forestry and Fisheries from 1986 to 1989. He belongs to the Cambodian People's Party and was elected to represent Kampong Chhnang Province in the National Assembly in 2003.

References

1936 births 
Members of the National Assembly (Cambodia)
Cambodian People's Party politicians
Living people
Government ministers of Cambodia